Love It (stylized as LOVE.IT) is the debut mini-album of Ai Otsuka under her pen name Love. It was released on November 18, 2009 under the label Avex Trax, and was released only one week after the release of Otsuka's compilation album Love Is Best.

Track listing

CD
 "Magic"
 "Starlight"
 "Moonlight"
 "Red Eye"
 "White Choco"
 "Love no Theme" (LOVEのテーマ, Love's Theme)

DVD
 "Magic" PV
 "White Choco" PV
 "Love no Theme" PV

References

External links
LOVE official website

2009 albums
Ai Otsuka albums
Avex Group albums